Thioxoethenylidene, is a reactive heteroallene molecule with formula CCS.

Occurrence
CCS is found in space in large quantities. This includes the Taurus Molecular Cloud in TMC-1, TMC-1c and  L1521B. These are likely in young starless molecular cloud cores.

Production
By condensing propadienedithione SCCCS or thioxopropadienone OCCCS in solid argon and irradiating with ultraviolet radiation, CCS is formed. Another way is via a glow discharge in a mixture of carbon disulfide and helium. Yet another way is through electron irradiation of sulfur containing heterocycles.

CCS and the anion CCS− can be formed in solid neon matrices also.

Properties
CCS can be a ligand. It can form an asymmetrical bridge between two molybdenum atoms in Mo2(μ,σ(C):η2(C′S)-CCS)(CO)4(hydrotris(3,5-dimethylpyrazol-1-yl)borate)2 In this one carbon atom has a triple bond to a molybdenum and the other has a double bond to the other molybdenum atom, which also has a single bond to the sulfur atom.

The ultraviolet spectrum shows absorption bands between 2800 and 3370 Å and also in the near infrared between 7500 and 10000 Å.
CCS can react with CCCS to form C5S.

The infrared spectrum in solid argon shows a vibration band at 1666.6 cm−1 called v1 and another called v2 at 862.7 cm−1. The 2v1 overtone is at 3311.1  cm−1. A combination vibration and bending band is at 2763.4 cm−1

The microwave spectrum has emission lines 43 − 32 at 45.4 GHz and 21 - 10 at 22.3 GHz, important for detection of molecules in molecular clouds.

Theoretical predictions show that the C-C bond is 1.304 Å long and the C–S bond is 1.550 Å.

References

Sulfur(−II) compounds
Inorganic carbon compounds